The following radio stations broadcast on AM frequency 1690 kHz: 1690 AM is a Regional broadcast frequency.

Argentina
 Cristo La Solución in San Justo

Canada

United States
All stations are Class B stations.

External links

 Radio Locator list of stations on 1690
 FCC list of radio stations on 1690 kHz

References

Lists of radio stations by frequency